"Underneath the Tree" is a song by American singer Kelly Clarkson from her sixth studio album and first Christmas album, Wrapped in Red (2013). She co-wrote the track with its producer Greg Kurstin. It is a Christmas-themed song that sings of gratitude for companionship during the holidays, in which the loved one is referred to as the only present needed "underneath the tree". Accompanied by various instrumental sounds, the song prominently incorporates a Wall of Sound treatment along with sleigh bells and bell chimes to resonate a holiday atmosphere. "Underneath the Tree" was first released to Adult Contemporary radio stations on November 5, 2013, by RCA Records as the album's lead single.

"Underneath the Tree" has been praised by music critics, who considered it the main highlight of Wrapped in Red and lauded its potential to be a holiday classic. They also favorably compared it to Mariah Carey's 1994 Christmas song "All I Want for Christmas Is You". The track reached number 8 on the Billboard Global 200 in addition to the top 10 in Austria, Canada, Germany, Lithuania, and the Netherlands as well as the top 20 in Hungary, Ireland, Portugal, Slovakia, the United Kingdom, and the United States. It has been certified platinum in Denmark and the United Kingdom, and gold in Australia and Norway. In 2021, "Underneath the Tree" was named the ASCAP's most popular Christmas song released in the 21st century.

Filmed by English director Hamish Hamilton, the music video for the song has a live performance from the television special Kelly Clarkson's Cautionary Christmas Music Tale at the Venetian Las Vegas. Apart from the television special, Clarkson has also performed it in various televised performances, such as Late Night with Jimmy Fallon and the American singing competition The Voice.

Production and composition 

After recording tracks for her greatest hits compilation, Greatest Hits – Chapter One, Clarkson began discussing with her record label RCA Records about plans for her sixth studio album being a Christmas release in late 2012, during which she also began to write original Christmas material. Greg Kurstin, whom she had previously collaborated with, was approached by Clarkson to produce the album; and together, they co-wrote the tracks "Underneath the Tree" and "4 Carats". "Underneath the Tree" was produced by Kurstin, who also played most of the instruments, including a mellotron and a Chamberlin, to evoke a Phil Spector's Wall of Sound treatment—a sound that Billboard and HitFix noticed upon hearing the song. He also had Clarkson provide all the voices in it, including all its backing vocals. She recalled the experience as new, stating, "I've never had to do anything like this before—doing all my backup vocals, essentially being my own choir."

"Underneath the Tree" is an uptempo big band-style Christmas, pop song written by Clarkson and Kurstin. It is one of the five original songs recorded for Wrapped in Red. According to the sheet notes at Musicnotes published by EMI Music Publishing, the song was written in the key of E major, in which the vocal range spans from E4 to G5. Apart from the Wall of Sound, various other sounds, such as sleigh bells and bell chimes, are also prominently heard on the song, which features a bari saxophone solo on the bridge.

Release 
On October 18, 2013, Clarkson premiered "Underneath the Tree" on her Vevo channel. On November 5, 2013, RCA Records released it as a single on Adult Contemporary radio stations in the United States, while also planning to release it on Mainstream Pop stations. It was then released as a digital download in the United Kingdom on November 22, 2013, and in the United States on December 9, 2013. A digital EP containing remixes of the song was released internationally on December 17, 2013.

Critical response 

"Underneath the Tree" has received critical acclaim from various music critics on its release, who lauded it as main highlight of Wrapped in Red and a prospective Christmas standard. Billboards Marisa Fox called it as the album's "biggest surprise", and described it as an optimistic tune that has Clarkson powering through Darlene Love-style vocals. Mikael Wood of the Los Angeles Times described it as a remarkably cheery single. In her review, Christina Vinson of Taste of Country remarked that the track "has everything a Christmas song could want: a jazzy, big band sound, saxophone and bells ringing, all bottled up in an optimistic and catchy holiday track" and said that Clarkson "shines", as her "strong vocals are needed to offset the snazzy production and chorus." In his review, Idolator's Carl Williott wrote that the song "sounds instantly familiar—sleigh bells, laments about a lonely Christmas day, a sax solo—but with a tightly coiled hook and Clarkson's transcendent voice, the whole thing is kind of invigorating." Sarah Rodman of The Boston Globe called it a bouncy, cooing number tailor-made to soundtrack sleigh rides, and named it the best track on the album.

Critics also approvingly compared it to Mariah Carey's modern Christmas classic "All I Want for Christmas Is You" (1994), a track that RCA chief executive Peter Edge described as the song's inspiration. Williot added that "Underneath the Tree" is strong enough that it could enter the pantheon of modern Christmas staples like Carey's "All I Want For Christmas Is You" and 'N Sync's "Merry Christmas, Happy Holidays". Jenna Hally Rubenstein of MTV News remarked, "if we may be so bold, it is definitely on par with other impeccable Christmas originals—namely Carey's "All I Want For Christmas Is You"." Sal Cinquemani of Slant Magazine noted the similar themes of both songs, and that "Underneath the Tree" is likely to become Clarkson's very own contemporary standard. Melinda Newman of HitFix wrote, "It's a finger-popping, bell-ringing pleaser that could achieve that rare feat of becoming a new Christmas standard. That hasn't happened since Carey's "All I Want For Christmas" in 1994." The Independents Hugh Montgomery called "Underneath The Tree" a "winner on all fronts" for having "sass, jingle, and a sax solo".

Commercial performance 
"Underneath the Tree" has recurrently charted every year since its original release in 2013. Upon the release of Wrapped in Red, "Underneath the Tree" entered the Billboard Holiday Digital Songs chart as an album cut at number four on the week ending November 16, 2013. Following its release as a single, it reached a peak position of number three on the week ending December 28, 2013. After being released as a single to Adult Contemporary radio, the song debuted at number 21 on the Billboard Adult Contemporary chart for the week ending November 23, 2013, eventually topping the chart after three weeks, and becoming her third Adult Contemporary number-one song and her first since "Stronger (What Doesn't Kill You)" (2012). That same week, "Underneath the Tree" also entered the Billboard Holiday 100 chart at number 34, making it her second entry at the Holiday Songs after "I'll Be Home for Christmas" (2011). The song entered the chart's top 10 after two weeks (at number 10). On the week ending December 21, 2013, the song entered the main Billboard Hot 100 chart at number 92, and ascended to number 78 on the week ending January 4, 2014. In 2018, "Underneath the Tree" re-entered the Billboard Hot 100 chart at number 44, and in 2019, it re-charted and reached a new peak of number 31. One year later (on the week ending December 12, 2020), the song re-entered the Hot 100 chart at number 30, and rose to an overall peak position of number 12 three weeks later.

Internationally, "Underneath the Tree" became a recurring top forty hit in Austria, Canada, Czech Republic, Germany, Hungary, Ireland, Latvia, the Netherlands, Slovakia, Switzerland, and the United Kingdom. After debuting at number 41 on the Billboard Canadian Hot 100 chart on the week ending December 21, 2013, the song reached a peak of number 28 after a week. In the United Kingdom, "Underneath the Tree" debuted on the Official UK Singles Chart at number 79 on the week ending December 14, 2013, eventually reaching number 30 on the week ending December 28, 2013. Nine years after its original release, the song re-charted and climbed to an overall peak position of number 12 (on the chart dated December 30th, 2022). It has sold over 318,000 units and has been streamed over 26 million times in the region as of December 2019. In Austria, "Underneath the Tree" debuted on the Ö3 Austria Top 40 chart at number 68 in 2014 and peaked at number 26 four years later. In the Netherlands, "Underneath the Tree" debuted on the Mega Top 50 chart at number 38 on the week ending December 14, 2013, and peaked at number 34 on the week ending December 28, 2013. That same week, it entered the Mega Single Top 100 at number 85, and peaked at number 69. "Underneath the Tree" entered the Dutch Top 40 chart at number 26, making it her first top 40 hit in that region after four years since "I Do Not Hook Up" peaked at number 19 in 2009. It then peaked at number 25 after a week. In South Korea, "Underneath the Tree" debuted at number 77 on the Gaon Singles Chart and at number two on the Gaon International Singles Chart on the week ending November 9, 2013. In Japan, "Underneath the Tree" debuted on the Billboard Japan Hot 100 chart at number 84 on the week ending January 4, 2014, and spent two weeks on the chart. In 2017, "Underneath the Tree" debuted on the national charts of Germany, Ireland, and Switzerland. In 2019, the song debuted on the Australian ARIA Singles Chart at number 54.

Music video 
On the eve of Wrapped in Reds release, RCA Records released an animated lyric video for "Underneath the Tree", featuring shots of ice skating, a snow-covered town, and copious Christmas trees. The lyric video was released to positive reviews, with Idolator's Sam Lansky describing it as "a nice visual accompaniment to the song that just lends an extra high-octane Yuletide cheer to its already-effervescent spirit". Hamish Hamilton directed the official music video, which premiered on December 3, 2013, on Vevo and featured a live performance of the song from the stage of Clarkson's NBC television special, Kelly Clarkson's Cautionary Christmas Music Tale.

Live performances and usage in media 
Clarkson has performed "Underneath the Tree" in various televised performances. She first performed "Underneath the Tree" in a live televised performance on The Today Show on November 26, 2013. Apart from being performed from the set of Kelly Clarkson's Cautionary Christmas Music Tale featured in the song's accompanying music video, a different live performance was aired during the television special itself, in which Clarkson was accompanied by children while singing it. She also performed the song on the fifth season of the American singing competition The Voice on December 3, 2013. On December 5, 2013, she then performed it on The Ellen DeGeneres Show and on Late Night with Jimmy Fallon. In 2016 Clarkson performed the track on The Wonderful World of Disney: Magical Holiday Celebration television special at the Walt Disney World resort, and the recording was used on the holiday comedy film Office Christmas Party. In December 2019, Clarkson recorded a performance of the song on her talk show, The Kelly Clarkson Show, as part of its "Kellyoke" segment.

Impact 
Brian Mansfield of USA Today reported that "Underneath the Tree" was American radio's most-played new holiday song of 2013. In a report published by ASCAP, "Underneath the Tree" was listed as the most-performed new and original holiday song in their repertoire in the years 2015, 2018, and 2019. Marketing curator PlayNetwork also reported that the track was one of the only newer original songs heard by holiday shoppers in 2015. In a 2017 op-ed piece by Pitchfork contributor Grayson Haver Currin on guitarist John Fahey's Christmas music, he sampled the song as a "new Christmas classic" along with "All I Want for Christmas Is You". In an interview on Vogue, Genius content director Elizabeth Milch referred to the song as "the most recent thing to make a play for the "All I Want" crown", while The Washington Post writer Allison Stewart also described it as a close cousin to "All I Want for Christmas is You". In a 2019 Mediabase report by The Atlanta Journal-Constitution, "Underneath the Tree" is the only new song from the past 20 years in their most played top 50 Christmas songs, as most of the tracks that are being played are from the 1940s to 60s.

In a retrospective listing of the best holiday songs from each year since 1967, Billboard editors chose "Underneath the Tree" as the best holiday song of 2013. Announcing the return of their 2019 Holiday 100 chart, Billboard reported that the track is the only one that was released in the 21st century to appear inside the top twenty. In a 2019 data analysis by Quartz reporter Dan Kopf, he remarked that the song might be a successor to "All I Want for Christmas is You" based on its chart performance. Several publications also promulgated "Underneath the Tree" in their best Christmas songs lists throughout the years:

 1st – Bustle, 16 Christmas Pop Songs That Totally Sleigh
 1st – Cosmopolitan, 17 Christmas Pop Songs That are Total Bops
 1st – Metro, Best Christmas Pop Songs of the 2010s
 2nd – The Varsity, 10 Songs that Need to be on Your Holiday Playlist
 7th – O, The Oprah Magazine, 50 Best Christmas Songs of All Time

 9th – Redbook, The 50 Best Christmas Songs of All Time
 18th – Men's Health, The 25 Best Christmas Pop Songs of All Time
 23rd – Good Housekeeping, 40 Best Modern Christmas Songs
 33rd – Country Living, 60 Best Christmas Songs of All Time
 33rd – Time Out, The 50 Best Christmas Songs of All Time

Track listing

Credits and personnel 
Credits adapted from the Wrapped in Red liner notes.

Recording
Produced at Echo Recording Studio, Los Angeles, California

Personnel

 All vocals – Kelly Clarkson
 Engineering – Jesse Shatkin
 Bass guitar, drums, engineering, guitar, horn arrangements, keyboards, production and programming – Greg Kurstin

 Mixing – Serban Ghenea
 Engineered for mixing – John Hanes
 Flugelhorn, mellophone, saxophones (tenor, baritone), trombone, trumpet – David Ralicke

Charts

Weekly charts

Year-end charts

Certifications

Radio and release history

See also 

 List of Christmas hit singles in the United Kingdom
 List of Christmas hit singles in the United States
 List of number-one adult contemporary singles of 2013 (U.S.)
 List of number-one adult contemporary singles of 2014 (U.S.)

References 

2013 singles
2013 songs
American Christmas songs
Kelly Clarkson songs
RCA Records singles
Song recordings produced by Greg Kurstin
Songs written by Greg Kurstin
Songs written by Kelly Clarkson
Sony Music singles
Song recordings with Wall of Sound arrangements
Songs about trees